The 2001 Japanese Grand Prix (formally the 2001 Fuji Television Japanese Grand Prix) was a Formula One motor race held on 14 October 2001 at the Suzuka Circuit. It was the seventeenth and final race of the 2001 Formula One season. It was the 27th running of the Japanese Grand Prix and the 17th held at Suzuka.

The race was won by the World Champion, German driver Michael Schumacher driving a Ferrari F2001 after starting from pole position. It was Schumacher's fourth victory in the Japanese Grand Prix (expanding his own record), his third for Ferrari and his ninth for the 2001 season. Schumacher won by three seconds over Colombian driver Juan Pablo Montoya in a Williams FW23. Third was taken by British driver David Coulthard in a McLaren MP4-16, having overtaken his teammate Mika Häkkinen late in the race. Rubens Barrichello (Ferrari F2001) and Ralf Schumacher (Williams FW23) completed the points finishers.

Schumacher set a new record for points in a season with 123 and biggest point margin to second-placed Coulthard with 58.

Enrique Bernoldi (Arrows A22) and Alex Yoong (Minardi PS01B) started the race from the pit lane. The race marked Jean Alesi's 201st and last Formula One race after a twelve-year career. Kimi Räikkönen (Sauber C20) spun off on lap five caused by left-rear suspension failure, forcing Alesi (Jordan EJ11) off in avoidance at the Dunlop Curve (Turn 7). It was Alesi's only retirement of the season. It was, additionally, the last race for the French Prost Grand Prix team as they went bankrupt and closed down during the following off-season. It brought an end to the team which began as Équipe Ligier after 26 years of Formula One racing. Mika Häkkinen scored his last World Championship points at this race, which was also his final ever start in Formula One.

This was also the last Grand Prix start for the Benetton team, after 15 years of competition.

Classification

Qualifying

Race

Championship standings after the race
Bold text indicates the World Champions.

Drivers' Championship standings

Constructors' Championship standings

Note: Only the top five positions are included for both sets of standings.

References

Japanese Grand Prix
Japanese Grand Prix
Grand Prix
Japanese Grand Prix